The Goodwin-Hamilton House, near Sylacauga, Alabama, is a Greek Revival style house built around 1850. It was listed on the National Register of Historic Places in 1986.

It has also been known as The Hamilton Place.

This was listed along with three other properties as part of a study of the estate.

See also
Benjamin H. Averiett House
William Averiett House
Welch-Averiett House

References

National Register of Historic Places in Talladega County, Alabama
Greek Revival architecture in Alabama
Houses completed in 1850